Richard E. Culatta is the CEO of the International Society for Technology in Education (ISTE). Prior to holding this position, he was the chief innovation officer for Rhode Island and the director of the Office of Educational Technology for the U.S. Department of Education (2013-2015).

Biography 
Richard Culatta grew up in Rhode Island. He received a bachelor's degree in Spanish instruction and a master's in instructional design from Brigham Young University. He is the son of Richard and Barbara Culatta, both educators and researchers in the field of communication disorders.

Career

Early career
Culatta began his career as a high school teacher. During the early 2000s, he was a technology advisor for the David O. McKay School of Education at Brigham Young University, helping redesign the technology component of the school's teacher preparation program. During this time, he was also the director of operations at the Rose Education Foundation, which helps schools in rural Guatemala. He worked at CIA University as a Learning Technologies Manager, then became an advisor on education issues to U.S. Senator Patty Murray (D-WA).

U.S. Department of Education Office of Educational Technology
Culatta was Senior Advisor to the U.S. Secretary of Education and Director of the Office of Educational Technology from 2013 to 2015. During his tenure, the office ran the #GoOpen campaign, which encouraged schools to use learning materials with open copyright licenses and proposed that all educational materials produced with grant money have open licensing. As director, Culatta also helped author the 2016 National Educational Technology Plan.

State of Rhode Island
Culatta left the Office of Educational Technology to become the Chief Innovation Officer of the State of Rhode Island. During his tenure, Rhode Island was used as a "lab" state for educational reform. A major focus was the personalized learning initiative, which aims to create learning experiences that are dynamic and individualized for each student. Rhode Island also became the first state to offer computer science in every K–12 school during this time.

International Society for Technology in Education
Currently, Culatta is the CEO of ISTE. This society creates standards for using technology in education. A current focus for Culatta and ISTE is finding ways to use technology to close equity gaps and redefine Digital Citizenship.

Publications 
Digital for Good: Raising Kids to Thrive in an Online World, Harvard Business Review Press, July 2021.
Culatta, Richard, and Katrina Stevens. "There's an App for That. Well, Maybe." Medium. August 21, 2015. 
U.S. Department of Education, Office of Educational Technology, Ed Tech Developer’s Guide, Washington, D.C., 2015.
U.S. Department of Education, Office of Educational Technology, Future Ready Schools: Building Technology Infrastructure for Learning, Washington, D.C., 2014.

References

External links 
 ISTE.org

Schoolteachers from Rhode Island
Brigham Young University alumni
United States Department of Education officials
Year of birth missing (living people)
Living people